K-1 World Grand Prix 2009 Final was a martial arts event held by the K-1 on Saturday December 5, 2009 at the Yokohama Arena in Yokohama, Japan. It was the 17th K-1 World GP Final, the culmination of a year full of regional elimination tournaments. All fights followed K-1's classic tournament format and were conducted under K-1 Rules, three rounds of three minutes each, with a possible tiebreaker.

The qualification for the top eight fighters was held at the K-1 World Grand Prix 2009 in Seoul Final 16 on September 26, 2009 in Seoul, Korea.

Michael Buffer was the ring announcer for the night.

Qualifying events

Match ups 

The match ups were held the day proceeding the World Grand Prix Final 16. All fighters drew a ball from a box with a numbers on them and chose their spots in order from who drew ball number 1 to number 8. Ruslan Karaev who was first up chose spot number 1. Badr Hari was up next and decided to face Karaev for the third time. Errol Zimmerman was next and chose the 7th spot. Remy Bonjasky had the choice of fighting Zimmerman or picking another spot. Remy was tempted to take the 3rd spot so to be given the chance to fight Badr in the semi finals, but was challenged by Zimmerman and Remy accepted. Jerome Lebanner decided to walk straight into the 5th spot. Semmy Schilt opted for a 4th match with Jerome. The last two finalists Ewerton Teixeira and Alistair Overeem will meet in the second quarter final match.

On November 28, it was announced that Sergei Kharitonov would be replacing Chalid Arrab to face Daniel Ghita in the second reserve bout.

Results

K-1 World Grand Prix 2009 Final bracket

See also
List of K-1 events
List of K-1 champions
List of male kickboxers

References

External links
K-1 World GP 2009 Final Special site
K-1 Official Website

K-1 events
2009 in kickboxing
Kickboxing in Japan
Sport in Yokohama